Indian Run is a stream located entirely within Delaware County, Ohio.

Indian Run was named for the Wyandot Indians who hunted there.

See also
List of rivers of Ohio

References

Rivers of Delaware County, Ohio
Rivers of Ohio